The Fannin-Cooper Farm, near Hiram in Paulding County, Georgia, was listed on the National Register of Historic Places in 2012.

Its main farmhouse, built in 1887, is a one-story, central hall plan house with a shed-roof front porch.

Structures
It includes a corn crib built in 1882, and a two-story mule barn.

References

Central-passage houses
Buildings and structures completed in 1882
Farms in Georgia (U.S. state)